Yermakov, or Yermakova (feminine: Ермакова), sometimes spelt Ermakov or Ermakova respective of the gender, is a Russian surname. Notable people with the surname include:

Anastasiya Yermakova (born 1983), Russian Olympic synchronised swimmer
Dmitri Ivanovich Yermakov (1846–1916), Russian photographer
Nicholas Yermakov/Simon Hawke, American writer
Pyotr Ermakov, Bolshevik war commissar  
Yevgeniya Yermakova (born 1976), Kazakh freestyle swimmer 

Russian-language surnames